Fitnat Özdil (1910 – 9 May 1993) was a Turkish rower for Fenerbahçe Rowing in Istanbul. She was one of the first female sport rowers in Turkey.

Private life
Fitnat Özdil was born in Istanbul, then Ottoman Empire, in 1910. She had two sisters,, Nezihe (1911–1984) and  Melek (1916– ) . She was employed by Sümerbank, from where she later retired.

Sports career
She started her sport rowing career at the age of 18 entering the watersports branch of Altınordu İdman Yurdu in Istanbul. In 1930, she transferred to Fenerbahçe Rowing. She became one of the first female sport rowers in Turkey along with Vecihe Taşçı and her two sisters. She and her teammates were known as unrivaled in coxless four rowing, and won multiple times Istanbul and Turkish championships. She retired from active sport in 1942.

Death
She died in Istanbul on 9 May 1993. She was laid to rest following the religious funeral at Söğütlüçeşme Mosque in Kadıköy. She was 63-year long member of the Fenerbahçe S.K.

References

1910 births
Sportspeople from Istanbul
Turkish female rowers
Fenerbahçe Rowing rowers
1993 deaths